Shallow Pond is an  pond in the Manomet section of Plymouth, Massachusetts, USA. It is located south of Fresh Pond, north of Briggs Reservoir, southwest of Cedar Bushes and west of Manomet Beach. The water quality is impaired due to non-native aquatic plants and nuisance exotic species.

Shallow Pond Estates
Shallow Pond Estates is a neighborhood that abuts the northern shore of the pond and spreads eastward to Route 3A south of Cedar Bushes.

External links
South Shore Coastal Watersheds - Lake Assessments
Shallow Pond Home Association

Ponds of Plymouth, Massachusetts
Neighborhoods in Plymouth, Massachusetts
Ponds of Massachusetts